ASIX s.r.o. is an electronics company, located in Prague, Czech Republic.

About the company 
The company was founded in 1991. It was the first private integrated circuit development centre in the Czech and Slovak Federative Republic. Since 1997 cooperated ASIX with Microchip Technology. Among others developed ASIX an electronic board for a satellite. The products of ASIX are used also by the USAF.

The most known products of ASIX are their development tools like Presto and Forte programmers and Sigma and Omega logic analyzers. In addition to producing development tools, the company engages in custom electronics design.

External links 

Technology companies of the Czech Republic
Electronics companies established in 1991
Manufacturing companies based in Prague
Czech brands
1991 establishments in Czechoslovakia